Siphonochilus bambutiorum is a species of plant in the ginger family, Zingiberaceae. It was first described by Karl Moritz Schumann and renamed by Brian Laurence Burtt.

References 

brachystemon